Aftab Hussain Saikia (born 7 April 1949) is an Indian Judge and former Chief Justice of Indian High Courts.

Career
Saikia was born in 1949. He passed B.Sc. from Cotton University in 1969 and completed LL.B. and LL.M. from Guwahati University. In 1974, he started practice in the Guwahati High Court on civil, criminal, constitutional and service matters. He practised for 26 years in the Guwahati High Court and other outlying benches in the North East India. Saikia was appointed public prosecutor of Government of Assam for three years. He also worked as principal as well as lecturer of J.B. Law College of Guwahati. He served as the guest lecturer in the Department of Law, Guwahati University. In 1999 Saikia was designated as senior advocate. He was appointed a permanent judge of the Guwahati High Court on 15 November 2000 and became the chief justice of Sikkim High Court on 7 March 2009. He was awarded Ph.D. in law by the Guwahati University in December 2009. On 13 April 2010, he was transferred to the Jammu and Kashmir High Court as chief justice. He retired on 6 April 2011 from the post. At present Justice Saikia is serving as Chairperson of Meghalaya and Assam Human rights Commission. He was the first sitting Judge or Chief Justice of High Court to obtain Ph.D. within the country while in office.

References

1949 births
Living people
Indian judges
Judges of the Gauhati High Court
Chief Justices of the Sikkim High Court
Chief Justices of the Jammu and Kashmir High Court
Cotton College, Guwahati alumni
Gauhati University alumni